Maine School Administrative District 46 (MSAD 46) is a school district that serves the towns of Dexter, Exeter, Ripley and Garland, Maine.  It is located in Penobscot County which is also known as the "Maine Highlands".  There are a total of six schools in the district: Garland Elementary, Exeter Elementary, Dexter Primary School, Dexter Middle School, Dexter Regional High School, and Tri-County Technical Center. Approximately 1,100 students from the area are enrolled.

History

In May 2014 the district had plans to eliminate the education technical position at Dexter Regional High School. It was a part of a proposed budget, approved by the SAD 46 board 5-0.

Tri-County Technical Center 
Tri-County Technical Center serves students from five Maine School Administrative Districts: 46, 48, 41, 4, and 68.  It currently offers nine areas of study: Automotive Repair, Commercial Truck Driving, Criminal Justice, Graphic Design and Communications, Culinary Arts, Health Occupations, Building Trades, Metals Manufacturing, and Computer Repair.

The Technical Center offers a variety of certifications and opportunities for credits earned to transfer to secondary education.  Sample certifications include:

Automotive Repair — Wix Filter certification and Timkins bearings certification 
Computer Systems Repair — COMP-TIA A+, Technician A+, and Network + 
Building Trades — 10- and 30-hour OSHA cards (10 in the first year, 30 in the second) and NCCER certification
Graphic Design and Communications — Adobe Certified Assistant 
Metals Manufacturing — 10-hour OSHA and Maine Oxy certification
Commercial Truck Driving — Maine Class A Commercial Driving License
Health Occupations — CPR & First Aid, PCA and Certified Nursing Assistant certificate — credits will transfer to Maine community colleges and to some public and private 4 year schools.  
Culinary Arts — ServSafe
Criminal Justice — two years in the program allows students to opt out of the Introduction to Law Enforcement class at Husson University.

References

External links 
MSAD 46's main website

46
Education in Penobscot County, Maine